Churches of the Pskov School of Architecture is a UNESCO World Heritage Site, listed in 2019. The site comprises ten churches or monasteries and related buildings around the city of Pskov in the Russian Federation. They represent the work of the Pskov School that drew from the Byzantine and Novgorod traditions, fused them with the local vernacular tradition, and adjusted the architecture to the use of local resources. The churches date from the 12th to the early 17th century, with the peak of this style in the 15th and 16th centuries. The architects from Pskov worked on monuments in several Russian cities, including Moscow, Kazan, and Sviyazhsk.

List of ten churches comprising the world heritage inscribed site

References 

World Heritage Sites in Russia
Pskov
Pskov School of Architecture
Churches in Russia